The Berziti (Bulgarian, Macedonian and Serbian: Берзити) were a South Slavic tribe that settled in Byzantine Macedonia in the 7th century AD with the Slavic invasion of the Balkans. The Berziti settled in the vicinity of Lychnidos (Ohrid).  One part of the same tribe settled in Brest, Belarus, while another, also known as Brsjaks (Macedonian and Serbian: Брсјаци,  Brsjaci), moved south into the Balkans.

Etymology 
There are several theories as to the origin of the name "Brsjaci" (Macedonian and Serbian: Брсјаци), according to the folk etymologies of the Mijaks recorded by Toma Smiljanić-Bradina the name comes from the Brsjak's great physical strength and endurance and propensity for violence and revolt with theories such as: "Brz i jak" (Брз и јак) meaning "fast and strong", and "Brziti" (Брзити) meaning "the fast ones" because of their supposed ability to run as fast as horses. Serbian writer Grigorije Božović also recorded similar findings which he ties to the Brsjaks ability to traverse mountains with ease and considers the name "Brsjak" (Брсјак) to be synonymous with "Highlander". 

According to Toma Smiljanić-Bradina the Brsjaks are named after the food that they gave their livestock which is called "Brst" (Брст).

Distribution  
The Brsjaks mostly inhabit areas in the central and western part of Macedonia with the Vardar River forming the eastern boundary, bordering the Mijaks to the west with the Bistra as a boundary, and to the south to Prespa and Pelagonija, the Brsjak identity is best preserved in the Azot Region due to settlements of a rival tribe the Mijaks.

See also
List of Medieval Slavic tribes

References

Slavic tribes in Macedonia
Sclaveni
Ohrid Municipality